Several ships have been named  :

 JDS Ume (PF-289), a Kusu-class patrol frigate of the Japan Maritime Self-Defense Force, formerly USS Allentown (PF-52)

See also 
 Ume (disambiguation)

Imperial Japanese Navy ship names
Japanese Navy ship names